Markies Deandre Conway (born October 21, 1991), known by the stage name Yella Beezy, is an American rapper from Dallas, Texas. He is best known for the singles "That's On Me", "Bacc At It Again", "Up One", and "Goin Through Some Thangs".

Early life 
Conway was raised in the Oak Cliff neighborhood of Dallas, TX. When Conway was 12, his father was murdered at their home in Oak Cliff on Mother's Day. Throughout his childhood he played basketball and football and his original aspiration was to become a professional football player. Conway became a Crip during his teenage years, and was selling drugs to support his family. He was often kicked out of school for fighting and ended up dropping out of high school without his diploma.

Career

2017–present: Billboard success and charting mixtapes 

Conway began writing song lyrics and rapping at the age of 13. He was inspired by artists such as Boosie Badazz and Kevin Gates. At the age of 14 he released his first mixtape, Mash Mode Overload. In 2012, his second mixtape, Lil Yella Mane, was released. Conway's first hit single came in 2015 with "Trap in Designer" off of his mixtape Broke Nights Rich Days.

In 2017, Yella Beezy released his mixtape Lite Work, Vol. 2. It featured the song "That's On Me", which peaked at number 56 on the Billboard Hot 100 and also led to Yella Beezy getting signed by Chris Turner (A&R) to L.A. Reid's label Hitco.

In 2018, the mixtape Ain't No Goin Bacc was released. It included the hits "What I Did" (featuring Kevin Gates), "Up One" (featuring Lil Baby) and a remixed version of "That's On Me" (featuring 2 Chainz, T.I., and Boosie Badazz). That same year, Yella Beezy began earning fame from opening for Jay-Z and Beyoncé in Dallas and Houston during the On the Run II Tour.

In 2019, the mixtape Baccend Beezy was the first mixtape by Yella Beezy that was released under his label Hitco. The mixtape featured the hit singles "Bacc At It Again" (featuring Quavo and Gucci Mane) and "Restroom Occupied" (featuring Chris Brown).

He was featured on Eritrean model Rubi Rose's single "Hit Yo Dance" featuring NLE Choppa.

Legal issues 
On October 14, 2018, Conway was shot on the Sam Rayburn Tollway in Lewisville, Texas at around 3:30 AM. Reports say that his vehicle was fired at 3 times. Conway was hospitalized and survived, while the shooter was found downtown Dallas.

Conway was arrested in Dallas on February 14, 2021, for possession of a firearms and was later released from jail on the same day he was booked. On August 11, 2021, the rapper was arrested again with drug charges.

Conway was arrested in Plano, Texas, on November 5, 2021, and for charges of sexual assault and possession carrying a weapon.
 Later that year, the sexual abuse charges were dismissed.

Discography

Mixtapes

Singles

As lead artist

Notes

References 

Living people
African-American male rappers
African-American songwriters
Rappers from Dallas
Rappers from Texas
Musicians from Dallas
Crips
Place of birth missing (living people)
21st-century American rappers
21st-century American male musicians
21st-century African-American musicians
1991 births